Hash Halper (born Tzvi Mair Lewis; April 21, 1980 - June 11, 2021) was an American street artist. He was noted for his chalk hearts which he drew on the sidewalks of Manhattan.

References

1980 births
2021 deaths
American graffiti artists
Yeshiva University alumni